The Dayton Correctional Institution is a state prison for women located in Dayton, Montgomery County, Ohio, opened in 1987, owned and operated by the Ohio Department of Rehabilitation and Correction.
The facility holds a maximum of 938 female inmates at various security levels.

Notable Inmates
China P. Arnold, convicted of the murder of her daughter
Debra Brown, serial killer serving life imprisonment without the possibility of parole for the murder of eight people

References

Prisons in Ohio
Buildings and structures in Montgomery County, Ohio
1987 establishments in Ohio